Éric Lapointe may refer to:

 Éric Lapointe (Canadian football), running back in the Canadian Football League
 Éric Lapointe (singer), francophone singer from Quebec